Paul William Zschorn (16 July 1886 – 13 June 1953) was an Australian first-class cricketer.

A right handed batsman, Zschorn played two matches for South Australia in the 1910/1911 Australian season, scoring 13 runs. He was a batsman for Sturt in district cricket.

References

External links
 

1886 births
1953 deaths
Australian cricketers
South Australia cricketers
Sportsmen from South Australia